Dave Chameides is an American steadicam operator and occasional television director. His work on the 2000 live televised play Fail Safe and on Ambush, a live fourth season episode of ER earned him two Emmy Awards.

As a director, his work includes episodes of ER, Third Watch and Studio 60 on the Sunset Strip as well as numerous commercials and music videos.

Chameides has also worked as a camera operator on a number of notable films, including From Dusk Till Dawn, St. Vincent, Donnie Darko, Shame, The Harder They Fall, and The Tragedy Of Macbeth and notable television shows such as ER, The West Wing, and Ozark'. 

He was nominated for an SOC Feature Film Operator of the Year Award for his work on the film St. Vincent in 1998 and won the SOC Television Operator of the Year Award in 2023 for his work on Ozark with B Camera operator Christian Trova. He has also won two Emmy Awards, one for his work on the LIve Episode of ER in 1998 and one for his work on Failsafe:Live'' in 2000.

Chameides has been an active member of the National Executive Board of ICG Local 600, The International Cinematographers Guild, spending time there as the chair of the safety committee and has also worked as a member of the Educational Committee of the Society of Camera Operators.

References

External links

Dave Chameides Steadicam Reel
Dave Chameides on SteadiShots

1969 births
Living people
American television directors
Artists from Hartford, Connecticut
Primetime Emmy Award winners